The 2019 Tour de Pologne was the 76th running of the Tour de Pologne road cycling stage race. It started on 3 August in Kraków and ended on 9 August in Bukowina Tatrzańska, after seven stages. It was the twenty-ninth race of the 2019 UCI World Tour season.

The race was won by 22-year old Team Ineos rider Pavel Sivakov of Russia, after a second place on the first mountain stage and a finish among the peloton on the final stage. Sivakov took the leader's jersey after the last stage, after previous leader Jonas Vingegaard suffered larger losses. Sivakov finished ahead of Jai Hindley of Team Sunweb on the sixth stage and overtook the Australian by 2 seconds, thanks to time bonuses. UAE Team Emirates' Diego Ulissi completed the podium, 10 seconds down on Hindley, and 12 in arrears of Sivakov.

Among the race's other jerseys, the points classification went to Groupama-FDJ rider Marc Sarreau, who took three finishes in the top ten and remained in the race until the end whilst the other sprinters withdrew. Simon Geschke of CCC Team won the mountains classification, overtaking Tomasz Marczyński on the final day after an intense fight within the breakaway, whilst Charles Planet of Team Novo Nordisk took the active rider classification, after entering the breakaway on four of six competitively raced stages and leading the classification for all but one day. By finishing ninth in the overall standings, Bora-Hansgrohe's Rafał Majka took the prize for the highest-placed Polish rider, while the teams classification was comfortably won by Team Ineos.

The race was marred by the death of  rider Bjorg Lambrecht after he crashed during the third stage, hitting a concrete culvert and dying during surgery in a hospital, where he was transported by ambulance following resuscitation at the crash site. The fourth stage was not competitively raced; instead, it was shortened and run as a cycling procession.

Schedule

Teams
As the 2019 Tour de Pologne is a UCI World Tour event, all eighteen UCI WorldTeams were invited automatically and obliged to enter a team into the race. Along with a Polish national team, three UCI Professional Continental teams – ,  and  – were given wildcard places into the race, and as such, formed the event's 22-team peloton. Out of these riders, a total of 110 riders made it to the finish in Bukowina Tatrzańska.

UCI WorldTeams

 
 
 
 
 
 
 
 
 
 
 
 
 
 
 
 
 
 

UCI Professional Continental Teams

 
 
 

National Teams

 Poland

Stages

Stage 1
3 August 2019 – Kraków to Kraków, 

For the third consecutive year, the Tour de Pologne began with a road stage starting and finishing in the city of Kraków, mostly designed for the sprinters. The peloton completed a large tour around the city, with the first intermediate sprint coming in the town of Myślenice before two third-category climbs, in Lanckorona and Witanowice. There was also another slight categorised ascent in Kaszów, with further intermediate sprints in Czernichów and on the run-in to Kraków, prior to three  circuits around the city centre.

The start of the stage was rather wet, before the roads dried up later on. Three riders formed the day's breakaway, as Jakub Kaczmarek and Adrian Kurek, riding for a select Polish national team, were joined at the front by 's Charles Planet. They gained a maximum lead over the peloton of four minutes. Kurek took maximum points at the first intermediate sprint, however he crashed on a slippery cobbled surface and was later unable to catch up to the leading duo, although he continued riding. Planet obtained maximum points on the three climbs, ensuring he would wear the king of the mountains jersey, whilst Kaczmarek led through the remaining two intermediate sprints to take the active rider jersey. In the peloton, meanwhile, tempo was being set by the  team, who caught the leaders just before the start of the first circuit, with  remaining. Almost simultaneously,  riders Filippo Fortin and Luis Ángel Maté hit the road after Maté hit a pothole, with neither of them being able to finish.

On the circuit, at the start of the final lap a second crash occurred, taking down Mark Cavendish, who was thus unable to compete in the sprint finish. 's Bob Jungels led the peloton onto the final kilometre, setting tempo for Fabio Jakobsen, before  came to the front for Danny van Poppel. ' Ben Swift was the first to launch his sprint, however he was overtaken by Fernando Gaviria, who in turn was overtaken on the line by Pascal Ackermann, with the German taking his second consecutive stage victory on the Tour de Pologne and his seventh success of the season, as well as the first yellow jersey of the race.

Stage 2
4 August 2019 – Tarnowskie Góry to Katowice, 

The second stage was again designed with the sprinters in mind, with the peloton taking to the streets of the Silesian Metropolis. After the start in Tarnowskie Góry, a  circuit was completed around the town, before the route led through Piekary Śląskie and Siemianowice Śląskie, with intermediate sprints in both town and a third on the run in to Katowice. There, there were three  circuits to complete, with two categorised climbs on the first and third lap. The finish was slightly downhill, and was identical to that used frequently in previous editions, with Sacha Modolo taking the honours in 2018.

For the second day in a row, Charles Planet made the day's breakaway, with the  rider being joined at the front by the Polish national team's Paweł Franczak. On the circuit, the tempo slowed, and the leaders managed to remain at the front until the second categorised ascent,  from the end.

Cesare Benedetti led the peloton for most of the final lap, before  moved to the front, only for their sprinter Fabio Jakobsen to be boxed in on the final metres, leaving him frustrated. 's work came to nothing too, as John Degenkolb could not find himself space. Gaviria finished second by a bike length, with Pascal Ackermann taking third place to keep the yellow jersey.

Stage 3
5 August 2019 – Silesian Stadium, Chorzów to Zabrze, 

The main breakaway of the day consisted of three riders: Adrian Kurek (Poland), Charles Planet, and Evgeny Shalunov. Planet, who was second overall coming into the stage, temporarily went into the virtual lead of the general classification after he managed to pick up 3 bonus seconds at the intermediate sprint. However, he slid out in a corner with under  to go, taking down Kurek as well. As a result of the crash, Planet finished several minutes behind the peloton and his hopes of taking the overall lead were dashed.

However, a television replay showed him pushing Marc Sarreau sideways during the sprint, and he was soon disqualified by the commissaires, with Ackermann ultimately being raised to the rank of stage winner.

After the stage, it was revealed that 22-year-old Belgian rider Bjorg Lambrecht of  died after crashing into a concrete culvert  into the stage. Though he was initially resuscitated and taken to a hospital, he eventually succumbed to the injuries suffered due to the crash during surgery. As a result, the podium ceremonies were significantly muted, and race director Czesław Lang addressed the crowd first, with a minute's silence occurring before the prize-giving.

Stage 4
6 August 2019 – Jaworzno to Kocierz, 

Following the death of Bjorg Lambrecht as a result of an accident the previous day, the stage was neutralized and was ridden as a procession in his memory, and in keeping with convention, there was no competitive racing. Afterwards, each team took to the front of the peloton for a few minutes, and members of Lambrecht's  team were allowed to finish first with their arms around each other, whilst officials from the race and the  team stood behind the line, and another moment of silence was held. The riders then proceeded towards their team buses.

The stage was timed (4h 16' 48"); however no results were recorded, and it did not count towards the general classification or any of the additional competitions.

Stage 5
7 August 2019 – Wieliczka Salt Mine to Bielsko-Biała,

Stage 6
8 August 2019 – Zakopane to Kościelisko,

Stage 7
9 August 2019 – Terma Bukowina Tatrzańska to Bukowina Tatrzańska,

Classification leadership table
In the 2019 Tour de Pologne, four different jerseys will be awarded. The general classification is calculated by adding each cyclist's finishing times on each stage, and allowing time bonuses for the first three finishers at intermediate sprints (three seconds to first, two seconds to second and one second to third) and at the finish of all stages: the stage winner wins a ten-second bonus, with six and four seconds for the second and third riders respectively. The leader of the classification will receive a yellow jersey; it is considered the most important of the Tour de Pologne, and the winner of the classification is considered the winner of the race.

There was also a mountains classification, the leadership of which was marked by a magenta jersey. In the mountains classification, points towards the classification were won by reaching the top of a climb before other cyclists. Each climb was categorised as either first, second, third, or fourth-category, with more points available for the higher-categorised climbs. Double points were also awarded for the premier first-category climb on the final stage.

Additionally, there was a sprints classification, which awarded a white jersey. In the points classification, cyclists received points for finishing in the top 20 in a stage. For winning a stage, a rider earned 20 points, with a point fewer per place down to 1 point for 20th place. The fourth and final jersey represented the active rider classification, marked by a blue jersey. This was decided at the race's intermediate sprints, awarding points on a 3–2–1 scale.

There was also a classification for Polish riders, with the highest-placed rider appearing on the podium each day. As well as this, a teams classification was also calculated, in which the times of the best three cyclists per team on each stage were added together; the leading team at the end of the race was the team with the lowest total time.

 On stages two and three, Fernando Gaviria, who was second in the points classification, wore the white jersey, because first placed Pascal Ackermann wore the yellow jersey as leader of the general classification. For the same reason, Danny van Poppel wore the white jersey on stages four and five, and Luka Mezgec wore the white jersey on stage six.
 On stages three to five, Paweł Franczak, who was second in the active rider classification, wore the blue jersey, because first placed Charles Planet wore the magenta jersey as leader of the mountains classification.

Final classification standings

General classification

Points classification

Mountains classification

Active rider classification

Teams classification

References

Sources

External links

2019
2019 UCI World Tour
2019 in Polish sport
August 2019 sports events in Europe